Upasarga is a term used in Sanskrit grammar for a special class of twenty prepositional particles prefixed to verbs or to action nouns.  In Vedic, these prepositions are separable from verbs; in classical Sanskrit the prefixing is obligatory.  

 pra- "forth"
 parā- "away"
 apa- "away"
 sam-/saṃ- "with"
 anu- "after"
 ava- "off, down"
 -/nis- "away"
 -/dus- "bad, difficult, hard"
 vi- "apart, asunder"
 ā- "near"
 ni- "down"
 adhi- "over"
 api- "proximate"
 ati- "beyond"
 su- "good, excellent"
 ut-/ud- "up(wards)"
 abhi- "to, towards"
 prati- "against"
 pari- "round, around"
 upa- "towards, near"

The  listing has these variants, not the forms in pausa, and thus has twenty-two items in all. 

A versified form of this list may be found in modern primers or textbooks:

Notes

References
 Monier-Williams, M., A Sanskrit English Dictionary, (reprint) New Delhi, Motilal Banarsidass 2005 
 Katre, Sumitra M.,  of Pānini, New Delhi, Motilal Banarsidass 1989

Vyakarana
Prefixes